Edward Sutton, 4th Baron Dudley (circa 1515 – 12 July 1586). The oldest son and heir of John Sutton, 3rd Baron Dudley. He was an English nobleman and soldier. Contemporary sources also refer to him as Sir Edward Dudley.

Life

He served in Ireland (1536) under his uncle Leonard Grey, 1st Viscount Grane, and in Scotland (1546) where, in 1547, he was governor of Hume Castle after its capture by the English forces. Hume was retaken by the Scots in December 1548, and Sutton captured. At the end of the war, on 28 March 1550, the Earl of Shrewsbury was asked by the Privy Council to organise his release by the exchange of French hostages to the value of £200.

He was knighted in 1553 and was restored to ownership of his ancestral Dudley Castle, which had been forfeited to the Crown by the attainder of his cousin the Duke of Northumberland in 1554. He was lieutenant of Hampnes, in Picardy, from 1556 to 1558; and entertained Queen Elizabeth at Dudley Castle, 1575.

Edward succeeded his father (known as the "Lord Quondam" that is 'Lord Formerly') as Baron Dudley in 1553. He was buried at St. Margaret's Church, Westminster on 12 August 1586. He was succeeded by his son, Edward Sutton, 5th Baron Dudley (1567–1643).

Family

He was the son of John Sutton, 3rd Baron Dudley and Lady Cicely Grey, daughter of Thomas Grey, 1st Marquess of Dorset; and the grandson of Edmund Sutton, Knight of Dudley Castle and Baron Tibertot and Cherleton (born 1425).

Edward married:

1. Katherine Brydges, the daughter of John Brydges, 1st Baron Chandos and Elizabeth (née Grey) of Wilton (m. 1556, d.1566) with whom he had the following children:

 Anne (b. c. 1556, d. 1605), who married first Francis Throckmorton, conspirator against Queen Elizabeth I of England, and second Thomas Wylmer Esq., barrister at law and had issue.

2. Jane Stanley, a daughter of Edward Stanley, 3rd Earl of Derby (m. 1567) with whom he had the following children:

Edward Dudley, who became the 5th Baron Dudley (b. 17 September 1567, d. 23 June 1643).
John Dudley (b. 30 November 1569, d. c. Feb 1644/45).

3. Mary Howard, the daughter of William, 1st Baron Howard on 16 December 1571 at Whitehall Palace in a triple wedding with Edward de Vere, 17th Earl of Oxford and bride, Anne Cecil, and Edward Somerset, 4th Earl of Worcester and bride Elizabeth Hastings.

The year after Edward's death, Mary remarried to Richard Mompesson (d. 1627), courtier and briefly Member of Parliament. She died in 1600 and is buried in St Margaret's Church, Westminster.

Notes

Attribution

1525 births
1586 deaths
16th-century English nobility
Edward
Edward
Burials at St Margaret's, Westminster
4